Red Hill Rail Trail is a 6.5 kilometre rail trail connecting Red Hill with Merricks, on the Mornington Peninsula, Victoria, Australia. It is primarily used by horse riders. It has gravel, dirt and grass surfaces.

References 

Rail trails in Victoria (Australia)
Mornington Peninsula